Physoderma alfalfae is a species of fungus in the family Physodermataceae. A plant pathogen, it causes crown wart of alfalfa.

References 

Fungal plant pathogens and diseases
Fungi described in 1895
Blastocladiomycota